WMXA (96.7 FM) is a radio station licensed to serve Opelika, Alabama, United States.  The station is owned by San Antonio–based iHeartMedia, through licensee iHM Licenses, LLC.

WMXA broadcasts a hot adult contemporary music format serving Lee County, Alabama and Columbus, Georgia.  The station's slogan is "Always #1 for Today's Best Music". WMXA consistently receives top awards for station and personalities, the latest coming in 2010 with The Tige Rodgers Morning Show being named "Best Small Market Morning Show" in the state of Alabama and WMXA along with the Zach Fox Morning Show being voted #1 "Best Of" Auburn-Opelika News.

History
This station received its original construction permit for a new FM station broadcasting with 3,000 watts of effective radiated power on 96.7 MHz from the Federal Communications Commission on June 24, 1991.  The new station was assigned the call letters WMXA by the FCC on June 28, 1991.

In July 1991, while the station was still under construction, permit holder E.T. Communications, Inc., reached an agreement to transfer the permit to H&E Communications, a Partnership.  The deal was approved by the FCC on August 20, 1991 and the transaction was consummated on August 21, 1991.  WMXA received its license to cover from the FCC on March 6, 1992.

In July 1993, H&E Communications reached an agreement to sell this station to Fuller Broadcasting Company, Inc.  The deal was approved by the FCC on October 18, 1993 and the transaction was consummated on November 30, 1993.

In August 1998, Fuller Broadcasting Company, Inc., reached an agreement to sell this station to Root Communications License Company, L.P., as part of a five-station deal.  The deal was approved by the FCC on October 5, 1998 and the transaction was consummated in December 1998.

In March 2003, Root Communications License Company, L.P., reached an agreement to sell this station to Qantum Communications subsidiary Qantum of Auburn License Company, LLC, as part of a 26 station deal valued at $82.2 million.  The deal was approved by the FCC on April 30, 2003 and the transaction was consummated on July 2, 2003.

On May 15, 2014, Qantum Communications announced that it would sell its 29 stations, including WMXA, to Clear Channel Communications (now iHeartMedia), in a transaction connected to Clear Channel's sale of WALK AM-FM in Patchogue, New York to Connoisseur Media via Qantum. The transaction was consummated on September 9, 2014.

Programming
On Weekdays, Maddox hosts from 12-5am. Rob Conrad is the host from 5-10am. Delana is on from 10am-2pm. Toby Knapp is on from 2-7pm. Chris Davis is on from 7pm-12am. On Saturday's, Maddox also hosts a show from 12-5am. Haze is on from 5-10am. Jennie James is on from 10am-3pm. Toby Knapp is on from 3-7pm and Joey Brooks hosts a show from 7pm-12am. On Sunday's, Kevin Rush takes over the overnight 12-5am slot. Haze is still on from 5-10am. Jennie James is on from 10am-3pm. Chris Davis takes over the 3-7pm slot. Joey Brooks Is still on 7pm-12am.

References

External links
WMXA official website

MXA
Hot adult contemporary radio stations in the United States
Radio stations established in 1992
Lee County, Alabama
IHeartMedia radio stations